Wentworth Parsons (25 October 1745 – October 1794) was an Anglo-Irish soldier and politician.

Parsons was the son of Sir Laurence Parsons, 3rd Baronet and Anne Harman. He gained the rank of captain in the British Army. Between 1766 and 1768 he was the Member of Parliament for Longford County in the Irish House of Commons. He married Charlotte Winter, daughter of Paul Winter.

References

1745 births
1794 deaths
18th-century Anglo-Irish people
Irish MPs 1761–1768
Members of the Parliament of Ireland (pre-1801) for County Longford constituencies